Jeta may refer to:

 Jeta Amata, Nigerian filmmaker
 Jeta (Guinea-Bissau), an island by the coast of Guinea-Bissau
 Jeta (film), an Indian Marathi language film

See also
 Jetta (disambiguation)